The Marion and Julia Kelley House is a historic house located at 450 4th Street East in Hazelton, Idaho.

Description and history
The shallow gabled roof has a shingle covering. The one story lava rock walls have a reddish brown color. Shingles in bands cover the gable walls above the stone. The house reflects the Bungalow style of architecture and is designed and detailed to serve as a town residence.

Julian Kelley obtained the title to the lot while Marion Kelley was serving in World War I. On returning he assisted a stonemason (believed to be Christopherson) in building the home, doing much of the carpentry himself. It was listed on the National Register of Historic Places on September 8, 1983, as part of the thematic resource "Lava Rock Structures in South Central Idaho".

See also
 Basalt
 History of Idaho
 National Register of Historic Places listings in Jerome County, Idaho

References

External links
 *  - depository for records about the house, including those cited in NRHP nominations

Houses in Jerome County, Idaho
Houses on the National Register of Historic Places in Idaho
National Register of Historic Places in Jerome County, Idaho